The 1st Bosai Cup was the first edition of the Bosai Cup.

Participants
The top players from China, Japan, and South Korea were invited to Chongqing to take part in an invitational tournament.
China: Gu Li, 9p and World Meijin.
Japan: Iyama Yuta, 9p, Meijin and Judan.
South Korea: Lee Sedol, 9p, BC Card Cup, Siptan, and Prices Information Cup.

Results
Players taking black are listed first.
Game 1: Iyama Yuta v. Lee Sedol - B+R
Game 2: Gu Li v. Lee Sedol - B+R
Game 3: Gu Li v. Iyama Yuta - W+R 
Champion: Iyama Yuta (Japan)

Game 1
China representative Gu Li drew a bye in the first round, setting up a first round matchup between Japan's Iyama Yuta and South Korea's Lee Sedol. Yuta, taking black, defeated Sedol by resignation.

Game 2
Yuta's defeat of Sedol matched-up the BC Card Cup champion with Gu Li, who received a bye in the first-round. Sedol, taking white for the second match in a row, lost again by resignation.

Final
Yuta faced Li in the final, winning by resignation in 208 moves. An Younggil, 8p from South Korea, commented on the game, saying "[Yuta] played this game wonderfully. White 112 was the winning move. [Yuta]’s endgame was perfect, and [Li] didn’t get any chances afterwards. This game should be one of [Yuta]’s best games, I’m sure".

References

2011 in go
Go competitions in Asia